West Asheville–Aycock School Historic District is a national historic district located at Asheville, Buncombe County, North Carolina.  The district encompasses 10 contributing buildings in a commercial and institutional section of West Asheville.  It includes one and two-story brick civic and commercial buildings, dating from about 1915 to 1936.  Their development was influenced by streetcar service along the Haywood Road corridor that operated from 1910 to 1934. Notable buildings contributing to the historic district include the McGeachy Filling Station (c. 1936), Buckner Building (c. 1924), West Asheville Fire Station (1922), Charles B. Aycock School (1953), West Asheville Bank and Trust Company (c. 1927), DeLuxe Barber Shop (1927), and Universal Motors (1928).

It was listed on the National Register of Historic Places in 2006.

Gallery

References

Commercial buildings on the National Register of Historic Places in North Carolina
Historic districts on the National Register of Historic Places in North Carolina
Buildings and structures in Asheville, North Carolina
National Register of Historic Places in Buncombe County, North Carolina